Andrighetto is a surname. Notable people with the name include:

 Florian Andrighetto (born 1953), Australian politician
 Sven Andrighetto (born 1993), Swiss ice hockey winger